Erling Lunde (19 February 1902 – 28 July 1982) was a Norwegian footballer. He played in two matches for the Norway national football team from 1927 to 1928.

References

External links
 

1902 births
1982 deaths
Norwegian footballers
Norway international footballers
Place of birth missing
Association footballers not categorized by position